Maidstone railway station could refer to:
 Maidstone Barracks railway station, on the Medway Valley Line
 Maidstone East railway station, on the Maidstone East Line
 Maidstone West railway station, on the Medway Valley Line
 Paddock Wood railway station, originally named Maidstone Road